The Hawaiian grouper (Hyporthodus quernus), also known as the Hawaiian black grouper, Seale's grouper or Hapuʻupuʻu, is a species of marine ray-finned fish, a grouper from the subfamily Epinephelinae which is part of the family Serranidae, which also includes the anthias and sea basses. It is endemic to Hawaii.

Taxonomy
The Hawaiian grouper was first formally described in 1901 as Epinephelus quernus by the American ichthyologist Alvin Seale (1871-1958) with the type locality given as Honolulu. It was formerly considered to be in the genus Epinephelus but is now considered to belong to the genus Hyporthodus. The specific name quernus means "oaken", presumably a reference to its reddish colour as an adult.

Description
The Hawaiian grouper has a body which has a standard length that is 2.3 to 2.7 times its depth. It has an angular preopercle which has 3-4 enlarged serrations at its angle, with the lowest pointing downwards. The upper margin of the gill cover is convex. The dorsal fin contains 11 spines and 14-15 soft rays while the anal fin has 3 spines and 9 soft rays. The membranes between the dorsal fin spines are deeply notched. The caudal fin is rounded. The adults are dark brown in overall colour and are marked with 8 vertical series of faint white spots which are obscured by many extra pale spots and blotches which vary in size. The fins of adults are largely plain and have a similar colour to the body apart from a small number of pale spots along the base part of the dorsal fin. Depending on habitat and where geographically found, some have a slight blue tint to their belly in the mature older adults, whereas in other areas they can have a slight reddish tint possibly for camouflage from predators. Juveniles are more variable in colour and may be pale greyish and the series of pale spots are more distinct and unobscured. The largest recorded specimen caught was 31.75 kilograms (70 lbs) off of Puako, Northwest Hawaii Island.

Distribution
The Hawaiian grouper is endemic to Hawaii and its range includes the Northwestern Hawaiian Islands and the Johnston Atoll.

Habitat and biology
The spawning season runs from February to June, peaking in March. This predatory species prefers to prey on other fishes with crustaceans, especially shrimp, as a second preference.

Utilisation
The Hawaiian grouper is valued for having clear white flesh which has a delicate flavour. It is regarded as a member of the "Deep 7" group of fish species which live in deep water, near the bottom, and are a valuable resource for fisheries in Hawaii, these species accounting for 50% of the total commercial catch in the State.

References

Pacific Islands Fisheries Science Center Administrative Report H-08-06, 19 p, http://www.pifsc.noaa.gov
Gillgren, Jerry G.; Ballam, Anthony: Malama Charters Hilo LLC, Commercial fishing vessel "Jovan Lee" field work, Northeastern coast of Hawaii Island (12/2019-3/2020)

Hawaiian grouper
Fish of Hawaii
Natural history of the Northwestern Hawaiian Islands
Midway Atoll
Near threatened animals
Near threatened biota of Oceania
Hawaiian grouper
Taxonomy articles created by Polbot